= Vishwalingam Vishwachandran =

Sri Lankan Tamil journalist

Vishwalingam Vishwachandran is a Sri Lankan Tamil journalist. He was attacked by Sri Lankan army men while he was covering the commemoration of Tamil war dead in Mullaitivu district.Committee to Protect Journalists has called on the Sri Lankan government for a impartial enquiry into the attack.
